Mi Haolun (Chinese: 糜昊伦;; born 10 January 1993 in Xi'an) is a Chinese football player who currently plays for Chinese Super League side Shenzhen.

Club career
After playing in the youth squad of Shandong Luneng Taishan, Mi started his football career in 2011. He played for Shandong Youth in the China League Two and scored 6 goals in the 15 appearances in the season. On 21 May 2011, he scored his first league goal in a 2–0 home victory against Hebei Zhongji. He was promoted to Shandong Luneng's first team squad by Henk ten Cate in June 2012. He eventually made his Super League debut on 12 April 2014 against Hangzhou Greentown in a 2–0 victory.

In February 2015, Mi was loaned to Chinese Super League side Shijiazhuang Ever Bright for the 2015 league season. He made his debut for Shijiazhuang on 1 May 2015 in a 3–1 away defeat against Beijing Guoan. He became a regular starter after the match, making 23 appearances in the league as Shijiazhuang finished 7th place in the 2015 season. He made a permanent transfer to Shijiazhuang Ever Bright in January 2016.

In January 2017, Mi moved to fellow Super League side Tianjin Quanjian. He made his debut for Tianjin on 4 March 2017 in a 2–0 away loss against Guangzhou R&F. He would establish himself as a vital member of the team and aided them to their highest ever position of third and qualification to the AFC Champions League for the first time in their history. In July 2020, Mi was one of eight former Tianjin Tianhai players to sign with Shenzhen FC. He would make his debut in a league game on 4 August 2020 against Guangzhou Evergrande Taobao F.C. in a 3-1 defeat.

Career statistics 
Statistics accurate as of match played 4 January 2022.

References

External links
 

1993 births
Living people
Chinese footballers
Sportspeople from Xi'an
Footballers from Shaanxi
Shandong Taishan F.C. players
Cangzhou Mighty Lions F.C. players
Tianjin Tianhai F.C. players
Shenzhen F.C. players
Chinese Super League players
China League Two players
Association football defenders
Hui sportspeople